Willian Borges da Silva (born 9 August 1988), known as Willian, is a Brazilian professional footballer who plays as a winger for Premier League club Fulham.

Willian started his career at Corinthians, before joining Shakhtar Donetsk in August 2007 for a fee of €14 million. In his six years at the club, he won honours including four Ukrainian Premier League titles and the UEFA Cup in 2009. In 2013, he briefly signed for Anzhi Makhachkala before joining Chelsea for £30 million, winning the Premier League and League Cup in his second season in England.

Willian made his debut for Brazil in 2011 and has since represented his country at the 2014 and 2018 FIFA World Cups, as well as the 2015 Copa América, the Copa América Centenario, and the 2019 Copa América, a tournament Brazil won on home soil.

Club career

Corinthians
Willian started playing futsal at 6 years old in his hometown Ribeirão Pires. In 1998 he joined the Corinthians youth system. In 2005, aged 17, he was already part of the squad that won the Copa São Paulo de Futebol Júnior. He was also among the Corinthians loanees that briefly played for Grêmio Mauaense in the 2005 Campeonato Paulista Série A3.

In 2007, Willian started playing for the Corinthians first team, where he wore the number 10. He made five league appearances during his first season with the senior side as Corinthians finished mid-table. His breakthrough came with Corinthians in the following campaign, featuring in 11 league matches, scoring twice, and made 29 appearances in all competitions for the club. Although they were 13th when Willian was sold, they ended up finishing 17th in the Série A and were relegated for the first time in club history.

Shakhtar Donetsk

2007–08 season
On 23 August 2007, Willian signed a five-year contract with Shakhtar Donetsk for a transfer fee of €14million. Willian's debut for the club came in a 2–1 league victory over Chornomorets Odesa on 15 September. He came on as a 57th-minute substitute, replacing fellow Brazilian Jádson. His first goal for the club came on 31 October in a 4–1 victory over Arsenal Kyiv in the Ukrainian Cup. He made his European debut in a 3–0 Champions League defeat to Italian side A.C. Milan on 6 November, coming on as a 73rd minute replacement for Răzvan Raț. He ended his first season with 31 total appearances, 28 of which came in the league, he scored 3 league goals. He helped Shakhtar to a Vyshcha Liha and Ukrainian Cup double. They won the league by three points over Dynamo Kyiv and also beat them 2–0 in the 2008 Ukrainian Cup Final.

2008–09 season

He played in the Super Cup penalty shoot-out victory over Dynamo Kyiv on 15 July, being replaced by Brandão after 46 minutes. On 27 August, he scored a goal in a 3–1 victory over Dinamo Zagreb in the Champions League. On 1 November, he scored his first league goal for Shakhtar in a 3–1 win against Zorya Luhansk. On 16 November, he scored the only goal in a 1–0 victory over Dynamo Kyiv. He scored the goal of the match in a 1–0 victory against Chornomorets Odesa on 25 April.

Willian played in Shakhtar's UEFA Cup Final 2–1 extra time victory against Werder Bremen, helping Shakhtar to lift the last UEFA Cup title before it was rebranded as the UEFA Europa League. He made 52 appearances in the 2008–09 season, scoring eight goals. He appeared in all but one league match, scoring five goals, and also netted a goal in a Ukrainian Cup round of 16 tie against Zakarpattia Uzhhorod, which Shakhtar won 4–1.

2009–10 season
Willian's first goal of the season came in a 6–1 Ukrainian Cup round of 32 victory against Dniester Ovidiopol on 15 August. He made an appearance in Shakhtar's 1–0 extra time defeat to Spanish side Barcelona in the UEFA Super Cup on 28 August, being replaced by Julius Aghahowa in the 90th minute of the match. On 17 September, he netted the second goal in a 4–1 win against Belgian side Club Brugge in a group stage match in the Europa League. He ended the season with 7 goals in 39 appearances, including 22 appearances and five goals in the league. He helped Shakhtar to victory in the Ukrainian Premier League. They finished the league with 77 points, six ahead of nearest rivals Dynamo Kyiv.

2010–11 season
Willian started the season with a goal in Shakhtar's emphatic 7–1 victory against Tavriya Simferopol in the Super Cup on 4 July. He followed that up on 10 July with the second goal in the first league match of the season, a 2–0 victory over Kryvbas Kryvyi Rih. On 15 August, he netted the only goal in a 1–0 victory against Karpaty Lviv, scoring in first half stoppage time. He also scored the only goal in a 1–0 win against Illichivets Mariupol on 29 August. On 8 March, he scored two goals in a Champions League last 16 tie against Roma, with Shakhtar winning 3–0 on the night and progressing to the quarter-final after winning 6–2 on aggregate. He played in the 2–0 victory over Dynamo Kyiv in the Ukrainian Cup Final on 25 May, being replaced by Alex Teixeira after 77 minutes. He ended the season with eight goals from 43 appearances, including 23 league appearances and three league goals. Shakhtar retained their league title with a score of 72 points, seven points ahead of second placed team, Dynamo Kyiv. They added the Ukrainian Cup and Super Cup titles to clinch a domestic treble.

2011–12 season

The following season, Willian played the full 90 minutes in the Super Cup match against Dynamo Kyiv on 5 July, however Shakhtar lost the match 3–1. On 19 October, he scored the opening goal in a 2–2 draw with Zenit Saint Petersburg in the Champions League. He scored the second goal in a 2–1 win over Illichivets Mariupol on 10 March. On 6 May, he played the full match in a 2–1 extra time victory against Metalurh Donetsk in the Ukrainian Cup Final. He finished the season with six goals, five in the league, from 37 appearances, 27 of which came in the league. Shakhtar secured the Ukrainian Premier League title for the third year in a row and the Ukrainian Cup title for a second time in a row.

2012–13 season
Shakhtar opened the season with a 2–0 win against Metalurh Donetsk in the Super Cup, however Willian failed to make the squad for the match. He had to wait until the fourth league match of the season, on 6 August, before making his first appearance of the season in a 4–0 win against Volyn Lutsk. He replaced goalscorer Alex Teixeira after 46 minutes. On 19 August, he scored his first goal and made two assists in a comprehensive 5–1 victory against Chornomorets Odesa. Willian scored both of Shakhtar's goals in their 3–2 loss against European champions Chelsea in the group stage of the Champions League on 7 November.

Anzhi Makhachkala
On 31 January 2013, Willian moved to Anzhi Makhachkala for a fee thought to be in the region of €35million. He originally chose to wear the number 10, however due to UEFA restrictions that states a player must wear a number used in the Champions League for the remainder of the season, he was forced to wear the number 88 he had chosen at Shakhtar. After moving to Russia, Willian said he was happy to join Anzhi and wished Shakhtar Donetsk great success in the future. On his debut, Willian sustained an injury against Newcastle United in a Europa League match. He scored his only Anzhi goal on 14 April 2013 in a 3–0 victory against Volga Nizhny Novgorod.

In August 2013, following financial restructuring, Anzhi chose to transfer their whole squad, including recent signing Willian.

Chelsea

2013–14 season
On 25 August 2013, English Premier League club Chelsea agreed a deal to sign Willian for a fee of £30million, subject to a work permit hearing on 28 August 2013. The deal was made official on 28 August 2013 and Willian signed a five-year contract, receiving the number 22 shirt. Although regulations usually state that non-EU players must be regular internationals, Willian was given a work permit despite only having two caps at the time, as an FA panel deemed that if he were not a Brazilian, he would have been a regular international and therefore would have had more caps.

Prior to signing for Chelsea, Willian had attracted interest from Chelsea's London rivals Tottenham. He completed a medical at Tottenham before meeting with Chelsea, which caused confusion as to which club he would sign for. Willian claims Chelsea was his first preference, and he would have only signed with Tottenham if the deal with Chelsea fell through.

Willian made his debut on 18 September against Basel in the Champions League in a 2–1 home defeat. After featuring in wins against Swindon Town and Steaua București in the League Cup and Champions League respectively, he made his league debut on 6 October away to Norwich City, and scored in a 3–1 win. He scored his second Chelsea goal on 1 January 2014 in a 3–0 victory at Southampton. On 27 April 2014, Willian scored in Chelsea's 2–0 away victory against Liverpool.

2014–15 season

Willian scored his first goal of the new Premier League season in a 3–0 win over Aston Villa on 27 September. On 25 November, he scored his first Champions League goal for the club in a group stage match against Schalke 04 in Gelsenkirchen.

In extra time in a League Cup semi-final against Liverpool on 28 January 2015, he took the free-kick which was headed in by Branislav Ivanović to put Chelsea into the final. On 1 March, Willian was selected to start against Tottenham in the 2015 League Cup Final at Wembley Stadium, a match which Chelsea won 2–0 to win the trophy for the fifth time.

Willian ended the 2014–15 season having appeared in 36 of Chelsea's 38 league matches as the club won its fifth league title.

2015–16 season

On 16 September, Willian scored directly from a free kick to open the scoring as Chelsea defeated Maccabi Tel Aviv in the club's first game of the Champions League group stage. He went on to score from free kicks in the team's next three matches; Premier League matches against Newcastle United and Southampton and a 2–1 loss at Porto in the Champions League. On 4 November, Willian scored his fifth free-kick of the season to give Chelsea a 2–1 win over Dynamo Kyiv, and 20 days later he recorded a sixth in a 4–0 triumph at Maccabi, making him Europe's top free-kick scorer of the season.

On 9 December, Willian scored his fifth Champions League goal of the season in a 2–0 victory over Porto in Chelsea's final group match, ensuring the team qualified for the knockout stage as group winners. He was subsequently named by UEFA as one of the top XI players of the Champions' League group stage.

On 13 May 2016, Willian was named Chelsea's Fans' Player of the Year and Players' Player of the Year for 2015–16.

2016–17 season
On 12 July 2016, Willian signed a new four-year contract. On 27 August 2016, he scored his first goal of the season in a 3–0 win over newly promoted Burnley.

On 22 April 2017, Willian scored twice in Chelsea's 4–2 FA Cup semi-final victory over rivals Tottenham at Wembley Stadium.

2017–18 season
On his 200th appearance for Chelsea, Willian scored twice and won two penalties as the Blues beat Qarabağ 4–0 at Baku National Stadium on 22 November. The win guaranteed the team progression into the knockout stages of the Champions League. In his next appearance, Willian came off the bench to score his first Premier League goal of the season, to rescue a point for Chelsea in a 1–1 draw against Liverpool at Anfield.

2018–19 season
Willian scored his first goal of the season, coming off the bench to complete a 4–1 come-from-behind win at home to Cardiff City on 15 September. Prior to this, he had won a penalty that Eden Hazard converted for his hat trick. On 27 January, Willian, on his 550th club appearance, netted a brace in a 3–0 home win against Sheffield Wednesday in the fourth round of the FA Cup. The first goal was his 50th for Chelsea.

2019–20 season
In August 2019, Willian became Chelsea's new number 10 for 2019–20 season, taking over from Eden Hazard. He scored his first goal of the season in a 2–0 home league win over Brighton & Hove Albion on 28 September. In the next fixture, Willian scored the winning goal on his 300th Chelsea appearance, a 2–1 away win against Lille in the Champions League. He scored a double to beat Tottenham 2–0 away from home on 22 December.

Willian scored twice in a 2–3 league defeat to West Ham United on 1 July 2020. In doing so, Willian became the first player to score a Premier League goal in every calendar month. He scored in his third consecutive game from the penalty spot in Chelsea's next league match, a 3–0 win over Watford; the goal meant Willian had scored nine league goals which was his highest league total in a Chelsea shirt.

On 9 August, Willian released an open letter about his departure from the club on Twitter.

Arsenal
On 14 August 2020, Willian signed for Premier League club Arsenal on a three-year contract. On 12 September, Willian made his debut for the club against Fulham, recording two assists, as Arsenal won 3–0. On 28 February 2021, Willian registered an assist in a 3–1 win over Leicester City in the Premier League, which was his first goal/assist contribution in the league for Arsenal since November 2020. On 9 May, Willian scored his only goal for Arsenal in a 3–1 home league win over West Bromwich Albion, sealing the Baggies' relegation to the EFL Championship.

Just after a year at the club, which Willian described as "the worst time that he had lived as a professional", on 30 August 2021, Arsenal announced he had left the club by mutual consent and confirmed that Willian was set to re-join his boyhood club, Corinthians.

Return to Corinthians
On 30 August 2021, Corinthians announced the return of Willian to the club on a deal running until December 2023. He rescinded his contract in mid-August 2022 after complaining about virtual threats during his last months in the club.

Fulham
On 1 September 2022, Willian signed for Fulham on a one-year contract. On 23 October, Willian scored his first goal for Fulham, their third goal in a 3–2 away win at Leeds United. His second goal came on 12 January 2023, against his former club Chelsea, the first goal in Fulham's historic 2–1 win over their West London rivals, also meaning Fulham had won 4 top flight games in a row, for the first time since April 1966.

International career

As a member of the under-20 Brazil team, Willian made his debut in the 2007 South American Youth Championship against Chile on 7 January 2007, which Brazil went on to win. In 2007, he was also selected for the FIFA U-20 World Cup, but Brazil were eliminated in the quarterfinals by Spain.

On 10 November 2011, Willian made his senior debut for Brazil in a friendly match against Gabon. On 16 November 2013, he scored his first international goal in a 5–0 win over Honduras in Miami, Florida.

On 7 May 2014, Willian was selected as part of the 23-man squad for the 2014 FIFA World Cup. He came on at half-time in extra time of the round of 16 match against Chile in Belo Horizonte for his Chelsea teammate Oscar, and took a penalty in the shootout which he put wide of the goal, although Brazil nonetheless advanced.

At the 2015 Copa América, Willian assisted Roberto Firmino's decisive goal in the 2–1 win over Venezuela in Santiago, a result which sent Brazil into the quarterfinals as group winners.

On 5 May 2016, he was named by Brazil manager Dunga among the 23-man list for the Copa América Centenario to be held in the United States.

In May 2018 he was named in Tite's final 23-man squad for the 2018 FIFA World Cup in Russia.

On 7 June 2019, he received a late call-up for the 2019 Copa América to replace the injured Neymar.

Style of play

A fast, agile, and technically gifted player, Willian is known for his quick feet, acceleration, and explosive style of play, which allows him to dribble past opponents at speed whilst keeping close control of the ball which is typically a Brazilian style, he has also been known to pull off feints and tricks, such as the elastico, in order to confuse and beat defenders. He primarily plays as a winger, and his high stamina, vision and creativity enables him to link-up play between the deeper midfielders and the forwards, and create goalscoring chances. During the 2015–16 season, while at Chelsea, he showed his prowess at direct free-kicks, with almost all his goals coming from set pieces. He improved the statistics of his attacking game due to which he was called Chelsea's top performer of the season.

Personal life
Willian is Afro-Brazilian and is married to Vanessa Martins. They have twin daughters, Valentina and Manuella. Like many Brazilian footballers, Willian is a devout Christian.

In April 2016, Willian was named in the Panama Papers.

On 13 October 2016, Willian's mother, Dona Zezé, died at the age of 57. During the game against the Premier League champions, Leicester City, his teammates Diego Costa and Eden Hazard dedicated their goals to Willian and his mother. Along with his teammates, his manager, Antonio Conte, also dedicated their victory to Willian and his family.

In 2018, Willian and his teammate David Luiz acquired Babbo, an Italian restaurant located in Mayfair, London.

Career statistics

Club

International

As of match played 15 November 2019. Scores and results list Brazil's goal tally first, score column indicates score after each Willian goal.

Honours
Shakhtar Donetsk
Vyshcha Liha/Ukrainian Premier League: 2007–08, 2009–10, 2010–11, 2011–12
Ukrainian Cup: 2007–08, 2010–11, 2011–12
Ukrainian Super Cup: 2008, 2010
UEFA Cup: 2008–09

Chelsea
Premier League: 2014–15, 2016–17
FA Cup: 2017–18; runner-up: 2016–17 
Football League/EFL Cup: 2014–15; runner-up: 2018–19
UEFA Europa League: 2018–19

Brazil U20
South American Youth Football Championship: 2007

Brazil
Copa América: 2019

Individual
Ukrainian Premier League Best Player: 2010–11
UEFA Champions League Team of the Group stage: 2015–16
Chelsea Player of the Year: 2015–16
Chelsea Players' Player of the Year: 2015–16, 2017–18
Premier League Goal of the Month: January 2018, February 2023
Chelsea Goal of the Season: 2017–18

References

External links

Profile at the Fulham F.C. website

1988 births
Living people
Footballers from São Paulo (state)
Brazilian footballers
Brazil youth international footballers
Brazil under-20 international footballers
Brazil international footballers
Association football midfielders
Sport Club Corinthians Paulista players
FC Shakhtar Donetsk players
FC Anzhi Makhachkala players
Chelsea F.C. players
Arsenal F.C. players
Fulham F.C. players
Campeonato Brasileiro Série A players
Ukrainian Premier League players
Russian Premier League players
Premier League players
UEFA Cup winning players
UEFA Europa League winning players
2014 FIFA World Cup players
2015 Copa América players
Copa América Centenario players
2018 FIFA World Cup players
2019 Copa América players
Copa América-winning players
Brazilian expatriate footballers
Expatriate footballers in England
Expatriate footballers in Russia
Expatriate footballers in Ukraine
Brazilian expatriate sportspeople in England
Brazilian expatriate sportspeople in Russia
Brazilian expatriate sportspeople in Ukraine
Brazilian Christians
People named in the Panama Papers
FA Cup Final players